Jules Nempon  was a French road racing cyclist. 
Nempon was born on 2 March 1890 in Armbouts-Cappel. Nempon first participated in the Tour de France in 1911, but did not finish. In total, he started in 10 Tours de France. His best result was the 1919 Tour de France, where he finished tenth. Because there were only 10 finishers, he also receiving the Lanterne rouge for finishing in the last place.

Nempon died on 7 June 1974 in Saint-Omer.

References

External links

1890 births
1974 deaths
Sportspeople from Nord (French department)
French male cyclists
Cyclists from Hauts-de-France